Bounds Green TMD (also known as Bounds Green Train Maintenance Centre) is a traction maintenance depot situated in Bounds Green, North London. The depot is to the immediate north of Alexandra Palace railway station. It is presently operated by Hitachi and maintains AT300 units for London North Eastern Railway, Hull Trains and Lumo.

History
In 1987, the depot had an allocation of Class 08s and HSTs and also maintained main line diesel locomotives. In 2021, the Class 91 switched depots from Bounds Green to Neville Hill.

Allocation
Class 08
Class 800
Class 801
Class 802
Class 803

Former Allocation
Class 91

References

Sources

Further reading

External links

Transport in the London Borough of Haringey
Railway depots in London